Javed Chaudhry (Urdu, ; born January 1, 1968) is a Pakistani columnist, YouTuber, and journalist who has been hosting the Kal Tak show on Express News since 2008. He also writes Urdu columns on various topics in his Zero Point series in the Daily Express.

Personal life 
Javed Chaudhry was born on January 1, 1968, in Lala Musa, Gujrat District of Pakistan to a Punjabi family. He graduated from the Islamia University of Bahawalpur with degree in Mass Communication. He also enrolled in a few courses at Johns Hopkins University and Columbia University.

Career 
Javed Chaudhry started journalism in 1991, with work on Daily Ummat and Daily Khabrain. He has been writing Urdu columns since 1997 under the header Zero Point. In 1997, he joined Daily Jang as a columnist. All Pakistan Newspapers Society declared him The Best Urdu Columnist of 1997 and 1998. He left Jang and joined Express News in 2006, and has been hosting a political talk show titled Kal Tak since 2008. Since 2010, he has also been writing English columns for The Express Tribune.

During his career, Javed has interviewed some of the prominent personalities, such as Malala Yousafzai, former president of Pakistan Pervez Musharraf, Shah Mahmood Qureshi, Chairman PTI Imran Khan and Co-chair PPPP Bilawal Bhutto Zardari.

Bibliography

Award(s) 
 APNS Best Columnist of Pakistan award (1997–98)
 Nominated for Agahi Award 2020.

Controversies and criticism 
Javed Chaudhry has faced criticism on multiple accounts. In 2012, he was accused of victim blaming, on basis of his April 1 column in the Urdu newspaper Daily Express. In 2018, in his satirical article, he claimed that Bushra Bibi married Imran Khan, after being directed by the Prophet in a dream. Bushra blatantly rejected this claim.
Javed was also criticized for doing nothing, during popular stand-off between Qadir Mandokhail and Firdous Ashiq Awan which led to Awan slapping Mandokhail, in his show.
In 2019, he published alleged interview of by-then NAB chairman Javed Iqbal in his column published on Daily Express, which NAB called fake and untrue.

References

External links
Latest episodes of Kal Tak with Javed Chaudhary 

Living people
1968 births
Islamia University of Bahawalpur alumni
Pakistani male journalists
People from Gujrat District
Pakistani YouTubers
Pakistani columnists
Pakistani reporters and correspondents
Pakistani television journalists
Urdu-language columnists
21st-century Urdu-language writers
20th-century Urdu-language writers
Urdu-language writers from Pakistan
Pakistani television talk show hosts